The Hong Kong Film Award for Lifetime Achievement is a special award presented to recipients who have contributed greatly to the development of Hong Kong films.

Recipients

References

External links
 Hong Kong Film Awards Official Site

Lifetime achievement awards
Hong Kong Film Awards
Awards established in 1995